Viva Seifert (born 15 April 1972) is a British musician and former gymnast. She began her career as a competitive rhythmic gymnast, and competed at the 1992 Summer Olympics. Following a number of television appearances, which include performing with the WeatherGens, she made her musical debut as a member of the band Bikini Atoll—active from 1999 to 2006—where she performed as a keyboardist. 

In 2010, Seifert and her brother, Gideon Joel Seifert—known better by his mononym Joe Gideon—founded the duo Joe Gideon & the Shark, in which she took on several roles in performing. The band has released two albums: Harum Scarum in 2010 and Freakish in 2013, with the former enjoying critical success. In 2015, she starred in the leading role of Hannah Smith in the indie video game Her Story, which earned her the Game Award for Best Performance and the Great White Way Award for Best Acting in a Game among others, and acclaim from several critics and publications. 

In 2021, Seifert co-founded the independent musical duo Lunge (stylized in all caps) with her husband Mark "Arp" Cleveland.

Early life 
Seifert was born in London, England, and currently resides in Cornwall. Her early aspirations were in rhythmic gymnastics. She keeps a low profile and does not frequently make media appearances, do interviews or speak of her personal life often; she does so to maintain her privacy. 

Seifert is married to musician Mark "Arp" Cleveland—once a part of Archie Bronson Outfit—with whom she has two children. Her daughter, Tipper Seifert-Cleveland, is also an actress.

Career

Early gymnastics & musical debut 
At the age of 18, she competed at the 1990 Commonwealth Games and finished fourth in the individual competition, winning bronze medals in the hoop and ribbon disciplines. She went on to participate in the 1992 Summer Olympics, finishing in 29th place in the individual rhythmic gymnastics competition. She was subsequently a part of WeatherGens, a group of several actors who played various characters made to represent the weather in PowerGen's sponsorship of the ITV National Weather between November 10, 1996, and October 27, 2001. She portrayed Aurora, who represented the hot and dry weather.
In 1999, Seifert and her brother, Gideon Joel Seifert, formed the band Bikini Atoll along with two other members, Ché Albrighton and Bastian Juel. In the band, Seifert was a keyboardist. In 2004, they were signed to the Bella Union label, and they released their debut studio album, Moratoria, which was received positively by critics, with The Independent describing it as "...an awesome, soul-searching slice of sprawling Americana." In 2005, they released their second studio album, Liar's Exit, which received positive reviews. In 2006, Bikini Atoll disbanded, and further activities were ceased. In 2008, Seifert appeared on an episode of Would I Lie to You? as a guest of Gabby Logan due to their time competing against each other in gymnastics. 

After the split of Bikini Atoll, Seifert and her brother formed the duo Joe Gideon & the Shark. They released their debut album, Harum Scarum in 2010, which earned a positive reception from critics. Online magazine Louder Than War described the album as "a hell of a find. An extraordinarily colourful collection of psychedelic stories – demented yet sympathetic eulogies to a bunch of fictitious weirdos, set to a fashionably succinct swamp-rock beat." Writing for Clash magazine, Mike Diver deemed Seifert "one of the fiercest, most technically gifted rock ‘n’ roll drummers around – it's unsettling even to see her crack a smile." Clash also said that she handled her work with "flamboyant precision". In 2013, they released their second album Freakish through Bronze Rat Records. The Quietus said that "…Viva's visual drumming style and Joe's control of any number of effects mangling, fuzzing and boosting an arsenal of crunching riffs to produce an enticing audio-visual package."

Her Story and independent music ventures 
In 2015, Seifert was cast in the video game Her Story, a crime fiction video game by Sam Barlow, where she portrays the role of Hannah Smith; later on in the game, it is suggested that the character has a twin named Eve, also portrayed by Seifert. Along with acting in the game, she also had a hand in the soundtrack, performing the ballad "The Twa Sisters" and helping alter the music. After previously working with Barlow on the cancelled game Legacy of Kain: Dead Sun, where she was set to portray the character of Lydia, he contacted her for the role after observing her work, stating that Seifert was "very good at picking up a line and intuitively pulling a lot of the subtext into her performance". She was offered the part after several edits were made to the script, which initially was 300 pages long before being shortened to 80. Filming for Her Story occurred in Seifert's residence, Cornwall, and lasted five days. She stated that the role was difficult to portray, commenting that shooting was "intense" and "rather exhausting" and said that she felt pressure after realizing "the whole game is hinging" on her acting.

Upon release, Her Story opened to instant and critical success, with critics praising the game as well as Seifert's performance. Justin Clark from GameSpot wrote that her performance "anchored" the game, and Andy Keller of PC Gamer stated that her performance was "understated, realistic, and complex". Joe Donnelly of Digital Spy believed her acting had the potential to inspire similar roles. Todd Martens of the Los Angeles Times praised her acting, and Adam Cook of GodIsAGeek deemed her performance "stunning". Rich Stanton of The Guardian wrote that "what seals the deal is a wide-ranging performance from Viva Seifert that funnels her character’s inner life into hundreds of intense vignettes" and further credited her for creating "a fictional character with something of the same allure: clearly very intelligent, clearly not telling the whole truth, and full of physical quirks. ... Seifert’s delivery is usually matter-of-fact and emotionally convincing." Chris Kohler of WIRED said "Seifert's performance is so captivating that I couldn't imagine this game working any other way." Katie Smith of Adventure Gamers wrote that she was convincing in the role, and praised her for paying attention to the small details, such as her body language. Polygon listed Hannah Smith on its list of the "70 Best Video Game Characters" and stated that Seifert played the role "superbly".

For the role, Seifert won the Game Award for Best Performance in 2015, where she was mistakingly credited for having appeared in The Witcher 3, which spawned several internet memes and earned the organization criticism. At the 5th New York Game Awards, the New York Videogame Critics Circle awarded Seifert the Great White Way Award for Best Acting in a Game. She shared the Golden Joystick Award for Breakthrough Game with Barlow, and was also a runner-up for the Performance of the Year Award. At the 12th British Academy Games Awards, critics were surprised to see that Seifert had not been nominated for Best Performer. The actress stated in an interview with BBC that "I was disappointed I can't lie. It was all leading up to this moment, but now there's more awards, actors are taking it [gaming] more seriously." Seifert also presented an award at the ceremony.

In 2018, Seifert voiced the character Merethiel in the video game RuneScape. In the same year, she made a guest appearance as Rachel on the British television series Delicious. In 2019, she starred in the short film Miss White as the titular character. Seifert is a part of the musical duo Lunge (stylized in all caps), which she co-founded with Mark "Arp" Cleveland, who was previously a drummer for Archie Bronson Outfit. They released their debut single "Heavy Golden Swim" in March 2022. In July 2022, it was announced that Lunge would make their live debut at the End of the Road Festival in September of that same year.

Filmography

Awards and nominations

Rhythmic gymnastics  
 Commonwealth games 
1990 - Two bronze medals - hoop and ribbon final, 4th place - All-around final

References

External links 

 
 

1972 births
Living people
Sportspeople from London
Musicians from London
British rock keyboardists
British rock drummers
British women drummers
British rhythmic gymnasts
English sportswomen
Olympic gymnasts of Great Britain
Gymnasts at the 1992 Summer Olympics
Gymnasts at the 1990 Commonwealth Games
Commonwealth Games medallists in gymnastics
Commonwealth Games bronze medallists for England
21st-century English women musicians
21st-century drummers
The Game Awards winners
Medallists at the 1990 Commonwealth Games